BB5 may refer to:

BB5, a postcode district in the BB postcode area
Base Band 5, a generation of the baseband implemented in the latest Nokia mobile phones
Blake Bortles, American football quarterback who wears number 5
Big Brother 5, a television programme in various versions
BB5 (film), a 2017 Indian Kannada language feature film